Oracle Business Intelligence Enterprise Edition Plus, also termed as the OBI EE Plus, is Oracle Corporation's set of business intelligence tools consisting of former Siebel Systems business intelligence and Hyperion Solutions business intelligence offerings.

The industry counterpart and main competitors of OBIEE are Qlik Sense, Tableau Software, Microsoft BI, TIBCO Spotfire, IBM Cognos, SAP AG Business Objects, Looker and SAS Institute Inc. The products currently leverage a common BI Server providing integration among the tools.

Extensions 
 OBIA (Oracle Business Intelligence Applications)
 Oracle Scorecard: an implementation of balanced scorecard reporting.

History

 2000: nQuire formed: Larry Barbetta, President and CEO. Edward Suen, Vice President and CTO. 
 2002: Siebel purchases nQuire.  
 2005: Oracle purchases Siebel (7.8.3.1) 
 2010: 11g Version Released
 2015: 12c Version Released

References

Bibliography

External links
 Oracle Business Intelligence Foundation
 OBIEE Blogs

Oracle software
Business intelligence companies
Business intelligence software
Business analysis
Big data companies
Data visualization software